Dichelobius flavens is a species of centipede in the Henicopidae family. It was first described in 1911 by Austrian myriapodologist Carl Attems.

Distribution
The species occurs in south-west and north-west Western Australia. Type localities are Eradu, Lion Mill, Jarrahdale, Donnybrook and Gooseberry Hill.

Behaviour
The centipedes are solitary terrestrial predators that inhabit plant litter and soil.

References

 

 
flavens
Endemic fauna of Australia
Centipedes of Australia
Fauna of Western Australia
Animals described in 1911
Taxa named by Carl Attems